Solomon Gundy is a Jamaican pickled (with salt) fish pâté usually served with crackers as an appetizer.

The pâté is made with smoked red herring (although other fish such as mackerel and shad are also sometimes used) and is minced and spiced with chili peppers and seasonings. The dish appears on the menus of Jamaican restaurants and resorts. It is also sold as a packaged food for export.

The term may come from the British word salmagundi, used to refer to a salad of many different ingredients. That term is originally from the French word salmigondis, which refers to a disparate assembly of things, ideas, or people forming an incoherent whole (a hodgepodge).

See also
Pickled herring
List of Jamaican dishes and foods

References

Sources
The food of Jamaica: authentic recipes from the jewel of the Caribbean. John DeMers, Eduardo Fuss. Tuttle Publishing, 1998. ,  Pg 123

External links
Recipe

Jamaican cuisine
Spreads (food)
Herring dishes